Edward Butterfield Vreeland (December 7, 1856 – May 8, 1936) was an American banker, businessman, and Republican politician who represented southern Western New York (Allegheny, Chautauqua, and Cattaraugus counties) in the United States House of Representatives from 1899 to 1913. He is best remembered today as an author and namesake of the Aldrich-Vreeland Act, which established the National Monetary Commission in response to the Panic of 1907. Vreeland served as its vice chair.

Early life
Edward Butterfield Vreeland was born in Cuba, Allegany County, New York.

In 1869, he moved to Salamanca, New York. He graduated from Friendship Academy in 1877.

Business and local politics
After his graduation, Vreeland served as superintendent of the Salamanca public schools from 1877 to 1882. He studied law, was admitted to the bar in 1881, but did not engage in active practice. He engaged in banking and in the oil and insurance business and became president of the Salamanca Trust Co. in 1891

From 1889 to 1893, Vreeland served as postmaster of Salamanca.

United States House of Representatives
Vreeland was elected as a Republican to the Fifty-sixth Congress to fill the vacancy caused by the resignation of Warren B. Hooker. He was reelected to the Fifty-seventh and to the five succeeding Congresses and held office from November 7, 1899 to March 3, 1913. While in the House, he was chairman of the Committee on Banking and Currency (Sixty-first Congress).

He declined to be a candidate for renomination in 1912, and was appointed a member of the National Monetary Commission, serving as vice chairman from 1909 to 1912.

Retirement and death
He resumed former business pursuits in Salamanca until January 1, 1936, when he retired from active business. He died in Salamanca; interment was in Wildwood Cemetery.

References

1936 deaths
People from Cuba, New York
People from Salamanca, New York
New York (state) postmasters
National Monetary Commission
American bankers
1856 births
Republican Party members of the United States House of Representatives from New York (state)
Vreeland family
School superintendents in New York (state)